Peter Du Cane  (1901–1984) was a Royal Navy commander and managing director of the engineering company Vospers.  He assisted in the development of the Blue Bird II amongst other boats.

Biography
Du Cane was born in 1901, the son of Charles Henry Copely Du Cane, of Braxted Park.  His paternal grandfather Sir Charles Du Cane was a politician and colonial administrator; his paternal grandmother Georgiana was the daughter of John Copley, 1st Baron Lyndhurst.

He joined the Royal Navy as a thirteen-year-old before resigning his commission as a Lieutenant-Commander in 1928.  The following year he joined the Royal Auxiliary Air Force where he flew Westland Wapitis in No. 601 Squadron RAF.  Du Cane was invited by Glen Kidston to join him at Vosper Shipyard.  Following Kidston's death and numerous ownership changes, Du Cane was offered the managing director's position.  He accepted, while maintaining his position as Chief Designer.

Under Du Cane's guidance, Vosper won a number of contracts for high-speed boats, including the construction of Blue Bird K4 which, piloted by Malcolm Campbell, took the world water speed record in 1939. Du Cane was awarded the Segrave Medal by the Royal Automobile Club that year for his efforts. He also designed a high-speed torpedo boat, the MTB 102, 350 of which were procured by the Admiralty, and which were used extensively during the D-Day landings.

Later in his career, Du Cane joined the Fleet Air Arm.  In 1964, he was made a Commander of the Order of the British Empire (CBE).

Du Cane died on 31 October 1984, aged 83, and was buried at sea.

Publications

References

1901 births
1984 deaths
Boat and ship designers
People from Essex
Royal Navy officers
Commanders of the Order of the British Empire
Burials at sea
Military personnel from Essex